Julian "Cannonball" Adderley is the second album by jazz saxophonist Cannonball Adderley, and his first released on the EmArcy label, featuring an octet with Nat Adderley, Jerome Richardson, Cecil Payne,  John Williams, Paul Chambers, Jimmy Cleveland or J. J. Johnson, and Kenny Clarke or Max Roach arranged by Quincy Jones.

Reception
The AllMusic review by Michael G. Nastos states "Nothing on the album screams as a standout, but there's an even-keeled consonance that is very enjoyable, and lingers to the point where you want to listen again and again. That enduring quality makes this recording special, and set the bar high for what Adderley would produce through a long and fruitful career as a jazz master. This album is the seed for that field of flowers". 
The Penguin Guide to Jazz gave the album a three star rating saying "the confidence and bro is already in place and seemingly unstoppable".

Track listing
All compositions by Julian "Cannonball" Adderley except as indicated
 "Cannonball" - 4:17  
 "Willows" (Quincy Jones) - 4:59  
 "Everglade" (Adderley, Jones) - 3:44  
 "Cynthia's in Love" (Billy Gish, Jack Owens, Earl White) - 3:07  
 "The Song Is You" (Oscar Hammerstein II, Jerome Kern) - 4:16  
 "Hurricane Connie" (Jones) - 4:18  
 "Purple Shades" (Phil S. Dooley, Lew Douglas, Frank LaVere) - 3:34  
 "Rose Room" (Art Hickman, Harry Williams) - 5:49  
 "Fallen Feathers" (Jones) - 3:48  
 "You'd Be So Nice to Come Home To" (Cole Porter) - 3:36
Recorded in New York City on July 21 (tracks 4-7), July 29 (tracks 1, 3 & 10), and August 5 (tracks 2 & 8-9), 1955

Personnel
Cannonball Adderley - alto saxophone
Jerome Richardson - tenor saxophone & flute
Cecil Payne - baritone saxophone
Nat Adderley – cornet 
J. J. Johnson - (tracks 1-3 & 8-10)
Jimmy Cleveland - (tracks 4-7) - trombone
John Williams - piano
Paul Chambers - bass
Kenny Clarke - (tracks 1, 3, 4-7 & 10)
Max Roach - (tracks 2 & 8-9) - drums 
Quincy Jones - arranger

References

1955 albums
EmArcy Records albums
Cannonball Adderley albums
Albums arranged by Quincy Jones
Albums produced by Bob Shad